Gustav Waldemar Elmen was a Swedish–American researcher.

Early life
Gustav Waldemar Elmen was born in on 22 December 1876 in Stockholm, Sweden. He emigrated to the United States in 1893 and became U.S. citizen in 1918.

Career
As a researcher, he worked at the Bell Telephone Laboratories. At Bell Laboratories, he invented magnetic alloys. His finding paved the way for high-capacity undersea telegraph lines.

In 1941, he founded Naval Artillery laboratory.

References

1876 births
1957 deaths
Swedish emigrants to the United States